This is a list of the mammal species recorded in the United Arab Emirates. There are thirty-five mammal species in the United Arab Emirates, of which five are endangered, five are vulnerable, and one is near threatened.

The following tags are used to highlight each species' conservation status as assessed by the International Union for Conservation of Nature:

Order: Hyracoidea (hyraxes) 

The hyraxes are any of four species of fairly small, thickset, herbivorous mammals in the order Hyracoidea. About the size of a domestic cat they are well-furred, with rounded bodies and a stumpy tail. They are native to Africa and the Middle East.

Family: Procaviidae (hyraxes)
Genus: Procavia
 Cape hyrax, P. capensis  introduced on Sir Bani Yas

Order: Sirenia (manatees and dugongs) 

Sirenia is an order of fully aquatic, herbivorous mammals that inhabit rivers, estuaries, coastal marine waters, swamps, and marine wetlands. All four species are endangered.

Family: Dugongidae
Genus: Dugong
Dugong, D. dugon

Order: Rodentia (rodents) 

Rodents make up the largest order of mammals, with over 40% of mammalian species. They have two incisors in the upper and lower jaw which grow continually and must be kept short by gnawing.

Suborder: Sciurognathi
Family: Dipodidae (jerboas)
Subfamily: Dipodinae
Genus: Jaculus
Lesser Egyptian jerboa, J. jaculus 
Suborder: Myomorpha
Family: Muridae (mice, rats, voles, gerbils, hamsters)
Subfamily: Gerbillinae
Genus: Gerbillus
 Wagner's gerbil, G. dasyurus 
 Balochistan gerbil, G. nanus

Order: Lagomorpha (lagomorphs) 

Lagomorphs comprise rabbits, hares, and pikas. Unlike rodents; they have four incisors on their upper jaws.
Family: Leporidae (rabbits and hares)
Genus: Lepus
Cape hare, L. capensis

Order: Erinaceomorpha (hedgehogs and gymnures) 

The order Erinaceomorpha contains a single family, Erinaceidae, which comprise the hedgehogs and gymnures. The hedgehogs are easily recognised by their spines while gymnures look more like large rats.

Family: Erinaceidae (hedgehogs)
Subfamily: Erinaceinae
Genus: Paraechinus
 Desert hedgehog, P. aethiopicus LC

Order: Chiroptera (bats) 

The bats' most distinguishing feature is that their forelimbs are developed as wings, making them the only mammals capable of flight. Bat species account for about 20% of all mammals.
Family: Pteropodidae (flying foxes, Old World fruit bats)
Subfamily: Pteropodinae
Genus: Rousettus
 Egyptian fruit bat, R. aegyptiacus 
Family: Vespertilionidae
Subfamily: Vespertilioninae
Genus: Eptesicus
Botta's serotine, E. bottae 
Genus: Otonycteris
Desert long-eared bat, O. hemprichii 
Genus: Pipistrellus
Kuhl's pipistrelle, P. kuhlii 
Genus: Rhyneptesicus
Sind bat, R. nasutus 
Family: Emballonuridae
Genus: Taphozous
Naked-rumped tomb bat, T. nudiventris 
Egyptian tomb bat, T. perforatus  presence uncertain
Family: Rhinolophidae
Subfamily: Rhinolophinae
Genus: Rhinolophus
Blasius's horseshoe bat, R. blasii 
Subfamily: Hipposiderinae
Genus: Asellia
Trident leaf-nosed bat, A. tridens 
Genus: Triaenops
Persian trident bat, T. persicus

Order: Cetacea (whales) 

The order Cetacea includes whales, dolphins and porpoises. They are the mammals most fully adapted to aquatic life with a spindle-shaped nearly hairless body, protected by a thick layer of blubber, and forelimbs and tail modified to provide propulsion underwater.
Suborder: Mysticeti
Family: Balaenopteridae
Subfamily: Balaenopterinae
Genus: Balaenoptera
 Blue whale, Balaenoptera musculus EN
 Fin whale, Balaenoptera physalus EN
 Bryde's whale, Balaenoptera brydei DD
 Minke whale, Balaenoptera acutorostrata nt
Subfamily: Megapterinae
Genus: Megaptera
Humpback whale, M. novaeangliae 
Suborder: Odontoceti
Family Physeteridae (sperm whales)
Genus: Physeter
 Sperm whale, Physeter catodon
Superfamily: Platanistoidea
Family: Phocoenidae
Genus: Neophocaena
 Finless porpoise, Neophocaena phocaenoides DD
Family: Delphinidae (marine dolphins)
Genus: Delphinus
 Long-beaked common dolphin, Delphinus capensis 
Genus: Sousa
 Chinese white dolphin, Sousa chinensis DD (Gulf waters of Abu Dhabi holds world's largest population)
Genus: Tursiops
 Bottlenose dolphin, Tursiops aduncus DD
Genus: Stenella
 Spinner dolphin, Stenella longirostris LC
Genus: Grampus
 Risso's dolphin, Grampus griseus DD
Genus: Pseudorca
 False killer whale, Pseudorca crassidens DD
Genus: Orcinus
 Killer whale, Orcinus orca DD

Order: Carnivora (carnivorans) 

There are over 260 species of carnivorans, the majority of which eat meat as their primary dietary item. They have a characteristic skull shape and dentition.
Family: Felidae (cats)
Subfamily: Felinae
Genus: Acinonyx
 Cheetah, A. jubatus 
Genus: Caracal
Caracal, C. caracal 
Genus: Felis
African wildcat, F. lybica 
Sand cat, F. margarita 
Family: Herpestidae (mongooses)
Subfamily: Herpestinae
Genus: Urva
Indian grey mongoose, U. edwardsii 
Genus: Ichneumia
White-tailed mongoose, I. albacauda 
Family: Hyaenidae (hyaenas)
Genus: Hyaena
Striped hyena, H. hyaena 
Family: Canidae (dogs, foxes)
Genus: Vulpes
Blanford's fox, V. cana 
Rüppell's fox, V. rueppellii 
Red fox, V. vulpes 
Genus: Canis
Golden jackal, C. aureus  
Gray wolf, C. lupus 
 Arabian wolf, C. l. arabs
Family: Mustelidae (mustelids)
Genus: Mellivora
Honey badger, M. capensis

Order: Artiodactyla (even-toed ungulates) 

The even-toed ungulates are ungulates whose weight is borne about equally by the third and fourth toes, rather than mostly or entirely by the third as in perissodactyls. There are about 220 artiodactyl species, including many that are of great economic importance to humans.
Family: Bovidae (cattle, antelope, sheep, goats)
Subfamily: Antilopinae
Genus: Antilope
Blackbuck, A. cervicapra  introduced on Sir Bani Yas
Genus: Gazella
Arabian gazelle, G. arabica  
Arabian sand gazelle, G. marica 
Subfamily: Caprinae
Genus: Ammotragus
Barbary sheep, A. lervia  introduced on Sir Bani Yas
Genus: Arabitragus
 Arabian tahr, A. jayakari 
Subfamily: Hippotraginae
Genus: Oryx
Arabian oryx, O. leucoryx  reintroduced
Gemsbok, O. gazella  introduced on Sir Bani Yas
Scimitar oryx, O. gazella  introduced on Sir Bani Yas
Genus: Taurotragus
Common eland, T. oryx  introduced on Sir Bani Yas
Family: Cervidae (deer)
Subfamily: Cervinae
Genus: Axis
Chital, A. axis  introduced on Sir Bani Yas
Genus: Cervus
Red deer, C. elaphus  introduced on Sir Bani Yas
Family: Giraffidae
Genus: Giraffa
Reticulated giraffe, G. reticulata  introduced on Sir Bani Yas

Locally extinct 
Leopard, Panthera pardus

See also
Wildlife of the United Arab Emirates
List of chordate orders
Lists of mammals by region
List of prehistoric mammals
Mammal classification
List of mammals described in the 2000s

References

External links

Lists of mammals by country
Lists of mammals of the Middle East
mammals

mammals